Zivko Prendzov (born December 11, 1957) is a Macedonian artist. He graduated from the Pedagogical Academy in Skopje in 1982, majoring in graphic direction, and holds a Master of Fine Arts degree in graphics. He is a member of the Association of Fine Artists of Veles and the Association of Artists of Macedonia. He began his career in 1979 as a conservator of the fresco and artifacts inventory from the ancient town of Stobi in SR Macedonia. Starting in 1989, he worked as a designer a textile factory called Nokateks and in 1996, as a professor of art in an elementary school. He has also participated in many group exhibitions organized by DLUV and Artists' Associations of Macedonia, Poland, Serbia, Bosnia and Herzegovina, Egypt, Kosovo, Bulgaria, Croatia, Slovenia and others. He participated in many art colonies in Macedonia, Bosnia and Herzegovina, Bulgaria, Montenegro, Serbia, Croatia. More recently, from 2007 to 2010, he served as the municipal coordinator of Art "Papradiski masters". He has presented solo exhibitions in Veles in 2006, Novi Pazar in 2008, Vranje in 2009, Ljubljana in 2009, and Kavadarci in 2010.

Winner of the "Sun of the Year" award for the first product design awarded by the Macedonian Ministry of    Economy in 2001.
Winner of the "B. Barutovski " graphics award, presented by the Association of the Art Teachers of Macedonia in 2004.
Won a gold medal at the Second International velesaem 1996 product design in Zagreb.

Exhibitions
*2006 Veles
2008 Novi Pazar
*2009 Vranje
*2009 Ljubljana
2010 Kavadarci

References

Living people
1957 births
People from Veles, North Macedonia
Macedonian contemporary artists